The 1962–63 NBA season was the Hawks' 14th season in the NBA and eighth season in St. Louis.

Regular season

Season standings

x – clinched playoff spot

Record vs. opponents

Game log

Playoffs

|- align="center" bgcolor="#ccffcc"
| 1
| March 20
| Detroit
| W 118–99
| Pettit, Hagan (31)
| Bob Pettit (15)
| Wilkens, Barnhill (6)
| Kiel Auditorium5,818
| 1–0
|- align="center" bgcolor="#ccffcc"
| 2
| March 22
| Detroit
| W 122–108
| Bob Pettit (42)
| Bob Pettit (18)
| Pettit, Farmer (5)
| Kiel Auditorium
| 2–0
|- align="center" bgcolor="#ffcccc"
| 3
| March 24
| @ Detroit
| L 103–107
| Bob Pettit (36)
| Bob Pettit (22)
| Lenny Wilkens (10)
| Cobo Arena3,232
| 2–1
|- align="center" bgcolor="#ccffcc"
| 4
| March 26
| @ Detroit
| W 104–100
| Bob Pettit (35)
| Bill Bridges (15)
| Chico Vaughn (9)
| Cobo Arena3,257
| 3–1
|-

|- align="center" bgcolor="#ffcccc"
| 1
| March 31
| @ Los Angeles
| L 104–112
| Bob Pettit (38)
| Bob Pettit (14)
| Pettit, Barnhill (6)
| Los Angeles Memorial Sports Arena10,086
| 0–1
|- align="center" bgcolor="#ffcccc"
| 2
| April 2
| @ Los Angeles
| L 99–101
| Cliff Hagan (34)
| Bob Pettit (16)
| Lenny Wilkens (7)
| Los Angeles Memorial Sports Arena11,225
| 0–2
|- align="center" bgcolor="#ccffcc"
| 3
| April 4
| Los Angeles
| W 125–112
| Bob Pettit (33)
| Zelmo Beaty (15)
| Lenny Wilkens (10)
| Kiel Auditorium7,396
| 1–2
|- align="center" bgcolor="#ccffcc"
| 4
| April 6
| Los Angeles
| W 124–114
| Cliff Hagan (33)
| Bob Pettit (15)
| Lenny Wilkens (10)
| Kiel Auditorium10,614
| 2–2
|- align="center" bgcolor="#ffcccc"
| 5
| April 7
| @ Los Angeles
| L 96–123
| Chico Vaughn (16)
| Mike Farmer (10)
| —
| Los Angeles Memorial Sports Arena15,212
| 2–3
|- align="center" bgcolor="#ccffcc"
| 6
| April 9
| Los Angeles
| W 121–113
| Bob Pettit (36)
| Bob Pettit (20)
| Lenny Wilkens (11)
| Kiel Auditorium8,110
| 3–3
|- align="center" bgcolor="#ffcccc"
| 7
| April 11
| @ Los Angeles
| L 100–115
| Bob Pettit (31)
| Bob Pettit (13)
| Cliff Hagan (4)
| Los Angeles Memorial Sports Arena14,864
| 3–4
|-

Awards and records
Harry Gallatin, NBA Coach of the Year Award
Bob Pettit, All-NBA First Team
Zelmo Beaty, NBA All-Rookie Team 1st Team

References

Atlanta Hawks seasons
St. Louis
St. Louis Hawks
St. Louis Hawks